This is a list of countries that have participated in the Miss World pageant and are still actively participating as of 2021. The pageant began in 1951.

List of active participating entrants

Replaced pageants
The following list consists of the delegations that have acquired the national Miss World franchise and replaced a former national pageant. Some of the former organizations still remain active for other purposes.

Inactive entrants

Former entities

Territories

Denmark

France

Netherlands

South Africa

United Kingdom

United States

Others
The following list consists of countries and territories that have not sent a delegate to the pageant since 2019, or no longer holds the Miss World franchise, but participated at least once in the past:

References

External links
 

Miss World
Miss World by country
Lists of countries in beauty pageants